The Wright Fusion was a low floor tri-axle articulated single-decker bus body built on the Volvo B10LA chassis by Wrightbus from 1998 until 1999. It was the articulated version of the Wright Liberator.

All 40 were purchased by FirstGroup for its Glasgow, Leeds and Manchester subsidiaries. In October 2001, four were sent from Glasgow to First London's Greenford garage to operate a six month trial on route 207.

Later Wrightbus models also used the Fusion name, but in conjunction with the name of the equivalent full-size rigid single-decker. These were the Solar Fusion on the Scania L94UA chassis, and the Eclipse Fusion on the Volvo B7LA.

References

External links

Articulated buses
Low-floor buses
Vehicles introduced in 1998
Fusion